Ankou is a town of Huating County, Pingliang City, Gansu, China. The town is highly industrialized.

The town was home to a large coal mine, which opened in 1954 and closed in 2004. The mountains around the town are also rich in various mineral and silicates which have been used for ceramics production going back 2,000 years.

References 

Township-level divisions of Gansu
Pingliang